Pavetta sparsipila is a species of plant in the family Rubiaceae. It is endemic to Tanzania. Pavetta sparsipila is classified as Vulnerable (VU) on the  IUCN Red List

References

Flora of Tanzania
sparsipila
Vulnerable plants
Taxonomy articles created by Polbot